Persi Warren Diaconis (born January 31, 1945) is an American mathematician of Greek descent and former professional magician. He is the Mary V. Sunseri Professor of Statistics and Mathematics at Stanford University.

He is particularly known for tackling mathematical problems involving randomness and randomization, such as coin flipping and shuffling playing cards.

Biography
Diaconis left home at 14 to travel with sleight-of-hand legend Dai Vernon, and was awarded a high school diploma based on grades given to him by his teachers after dropping out of George Washington High School. He returned to school at age 24 to learn math, motivated to read William Feller's famous two-volume treatise on probability theory, An Introduction to Probability Theory and Its Applications. He attended the City College of New York for his undergraduate work, graduating in 1971, and then obtained a Ph.D. in Mathematical Statistics from Harvard University in 1974), learned to read Feller, and became a mathematical probabilist.

According to Martin Gardner, at school, Diaconis supported himself by playing poker on ships between New York and South America.  Gardner recalls that Diaconis had "fantastic second deal and bottom deal".

Diaconis is married to Stanford statistics professor Susan Holmes.

Career
Diaconis  received a MacArthur Fellowship in 1982. In 1990, he published (with Dave Bayer) a paper entitled "Trailing the Dovetail Shuffle to Its Lair" (a term coined by magician Charles Jordan in the early 1900s) which established rigorous results on how many times a deck of playing cards must be riffle shuffled before it can be considered random according to the mathematical measure total variation distance.  Diaconis is often cited for the simplified proposition that it takes seven shuffles to randomize a deck.  More precisely, Diaconis showed that, in the Gilbert–Shannon–Reeds model of how likely it is that a riffle results in a particular riffle shuffle permutation, it takes 5 riffles before the total variation distance of a 52-card deck begins to drop significantly from the maximum value of 1.0, and 7 riffles before it drops below 0.5 very quickly (a threshold phenomenon), after which it is reduced by a factor of 2 every shuffle. When entropy is viewed as the probabilistic distance, riffle shuffling seems to take less time to mix, and the threshold phenomenon goes away (because the entropy function is subadditive).

Diaconis has coauthored several more recent papers expanding on his 1992 results and relating the problem of shuffling cards to other problems in mathematics. Among other things, they showed that the separation distance of an ordered blackjack deck (that is, aces on top, followed by 2's, followed by 3's, etc.) drops below .5 after 7 shuffles.  Separation distance is an upper bound for variation distance.

Diaconis has been hired by casino executives to search for subtle flaws in their automatic card shuffling machines.  Diaconis soon found some and the horrified executives responded, "We are not pleased with your conclusions but we believe them and that's what we hired you for."

He served on the Mathematical Sciences jury of the Infosys Prize in 2011 and 2012.

Recognition
1982 – Awarded a MacArthur Fellowship 
1982 – Awarded the Rollo Davidson Prize
1990 – Invited Speaker of the International Congress of Mathematicians (ICM)
1995 – Elected to the National Academy of Sciences
1997 – Gibbs Lecturer, American Mathematical Society
1998 – Plenary Speaker of the ICM
2003 – Received an honorary D. Sci. degree from the University of Chicago.
2005 – Elected to the American Philosophical Society
2006 – Awarded the Van Wijngaarden Award
2012 – Awarded the Levi L. Conant Prize
2012 – Fellow of the American Mathematical Society
2013 – Received an Honorary Degree from the University of St Andrews.
2014 – Recipient of Cahit Arf Lecture by Middle East Technical University, Ankara, Turkey

Works
The books written or coauthored by Diaconis include:
 Group Representations In Probability And Statistics (Institute of Mathematical Statistics, 1988)
 Magical Mathematics: The Mathematical Ideas That Animate Great Magic Tricks (with Ronald L. Graham, Princeton University Press, 2012), winner of the 2013 Euler Book Prize
 Ten Great Ideas about Chance (with Brian Skyrms, Princeton University Press, 2018)

His other publications include:
"Theories of data analysis: from magical thinking through classical statistics", in

See also
Freedman–Diaconis rule
Patience sorting
Random walk
Mathemagician

References

External links

 Interview: Persi Diaconis discusses his life, magic and mathematics on the 7th Avenue Project radio show
 

1945 births
Members of the United States National Academy of Sciences
Living people
MacArthur Fellows
20th-century American mathematicians
21st-century American mathematicians
Mathematics popularizers
Probability theorists
American magicians
American statisticians
Harvard University alumni
Stanford University Department of Mathematics faculty
Scientists at Bell Labs
Presidents of the Institute of Mathematical Statistics
Fellows of the American Mathematical Society
Fellows of the American Statistical Association
American people of Greek descent
City College of New York alumni
Members of the American Philosophical Society
Cornell University faculty
George Washington Educational Campus alumni
Jewish scientists